Nape is the back of the neck.

Nape or NAPE may also refer to:

Places
 Nape (Lesbos), a town of ancient Lesbos
 Napé, an administrative center town in Laos

People
 Nape 'a Motana (born 1945), South African writer
 Nape Nnauye, 21st century Tanzanian politician
 David Nape (1870–1913), composer, member of the Royal Hawaiian Band, inducted into the Hawaiian Music Hall of Fame
 Jeffery Nape (1964–2016), Speaker of the National Parliament and Governor-General of Papua New Guinea

NAPE
 N-Acylphosphatidyletthanolamine, a class of hormone
 German National Action Plan on Energy Efficiency (German: Nationale Aktionsplan Energieeffizienz)
 National Academy for Primary Education, a Bangladesh government academy training primary school teachers
 NAPE Foundation, a non-profit organization which supports disadvantaged students in Ghana
 Newfoundland Association of Public and Private Employees , a union in Newfoundland & Labrador